Walter "Wally" Paul Ladrow (October 16, 1895 – July 22, 1974) was a professional American football player.  He was an original member of the Green Bay Packers. He played for the Packers as a running back during the Packers first two seasons, 1919 and 1920, the two years before the team joined the National Football League (NFL). After teammate Gus Rosenow died in June 1974, Wally was the final surviving member of the Packers inaugural 1919 team.

References

Additional sources

External links

Packers' Smiley Johnson gave his life for his country at Packers.com

1895 births
1974 deaths
American football halfbacks
Green Bay Packers players
People from Oconto County, Wisconsin
Players of American football from Wisconsin